Chaumont-sur-Loire, commonly known as Chaumont, is a commune and town in the Loir-et-Cher department and the administrative region of Centre-Val de Loire, France, known for its historical defensive walls and its castle.

Château de Chaumont-sur-Loire
The castle was founded by Odo 1 (973-996), Count of Blois. At each epoch of French history the Château has been owned, rented or visited by significant persons in French and European history.
In the period between the late enlightenment and the romantic period, Germaine de Staël was resident from April to August 1810. Many famous guests visited the lively and politically active Madame de Staël including Madame Récamier, Adelbert von Chamisso, the counts of Sabran and Salaberry as well as the author of "Adolphe", Benjamin Constant.

Gallery

Chaumont Garden Festival

Population

See also
 Château de Chaumont
 Communes of the Loir-et-Cher department

References

Communes of Loir-et-Cher